The Harvard Legal Aid Bureau ("HLAB") is the oldest student-run legal services office in the United States, founded in 1913. The bureau is one of three honors societies at the law school, along with the Harvard Law Review and the Board of Student Advisers. Students who are selected for more than one of these three organizations may only join one.

The Harvard Legal Aid Bureau is a student-run law firm serving clients in housing law (landlord–tenant relations, public housing, subsidized housing, foreclosure defense), family law (divorce, custody, paternity, child support), government benefits (Social Security, unemployment benefits), and wage and hour cases (unpaid or underpaid wages, benefits, and overtime). The bureau employs nine supervising attorneys and selects approximately twenty-five student members annually. Students practice under the supervision of admitted attorneys; however, students are the primary case handlers on all matters. As a result, students gain firsthand experience appearing in court, negotiating with opposing attorneys, and working directly with clients. Students receive both classroom and clinical credits for their work at the bureau.

Unlike most clinical programs at Harvard, the bureau is a two-year commitment. This gives students a chance to have a much more sustained and in-depth academic experience. In addition to the substantive legal experience, students gain practical experience managing a law firm. The student board of directors makes all decisions regarding case intake, budget management, and office administration.

Notable members include Supreme Court Justice William J. Brennan, Massachusetts Governor Deval Patrick, activist and First Lady Michelle Obama, Attorney General Loretta Lynch, Berkshire Hathaway's Charlie Munger and law professors Erwin Chemerinsky and Laurence Tribe.

Overview
The bureau is composed of approximately fifty second- and third-year student attorneys at Harvard Law School who provide free legal services to a diverse population of low-income clients in the Greater Boston area.  It is Boston's second largest legal services provider.

Members of the bureau practice under Rule 3:03 of the Massachusetts Supreme Judicial Court, which allows them to appear in court as counsel of record for low-income clients.  The bureau currently employs nine practicing attorneys who train and supervise members.

Bureau members practice in the following general practice areas: housing law, family law, government benefits, and employment law. Students usually focus primarily on housing or family law. Within these practices, students work on matters such as eviction defense, domestic violence, child custody and support, divorce, social security benefits, wage and hour violations, and employment discrimination cases.

Alumni

Prominent alumni of the Harvard Legal Aid Bureau include:

 Hon. William J. Brennan, Associate Justice of the United States Supreme Court
 Michelle Obama, First Lady of the United States
 Loretta Lynch, United States Attorney General
 Erwin Chemerinsky, constitutional law scholar and founding Dean of the University of California, Irvine School of Law
 Hon. Ojetta Rogeriee Thompson, United States Court of Appeals for the First Circuit
 Hon. Frank M. Coffin, United States Court of Appeals for the First Circuit
 Hon. Matthew Kennelly, United States District Judge for the Northern District of Illinois
 Hon. William Schwarzer, senior United States District Judge for the Northern District of California
 Hon. Jed Rakoff, United States District Judge for the Southern District of New York
 Hon. Emily C. Hewitt, Chief Judge of the United States Court of Federal Claims
 Hon. Fernande R.V. Duffly, Justice of the Supreme Judicial Court of Massachusetts
 Hon. Daniel Joseph O'Hern, Justice on the New Jersey Supreme Court
 Stephen W. Preston, General Counsel, Central Intelligence Agency and former General Counsel of the Navy
 Will A. Gunn, General Counsel, U.S. Department of Veterans Affairs
 Charles Munger, Vice-Chairman of Berkshire Hathaway and business partner of Warren Buffett
 Alan Khazei, CEO of Be the Change, U.S. Senate candidate
 Raj Goyle, State Congressman representing the 87th district of Kansas.
 Joseph P. Kennedy III, U.S. Representative for Massachusetts 4th Congressional District.
 Joseph Anthony Califano, Jr, 12th United States Secretary of Health, Education, and Welfare
 David L. Kirp, Professor of Public Policy, University of California, Berkeley
 Jeffrey Steingarten, author and food editor of Vogue Magazine
 Prof. Peter Murray, Harvard Law School Professor
 Ruthzee Louijeune, Boston City Councilor At-Large

References

External links
 

Harvard Law School
Housing in Massachusetts